The Women's super -G competition of the 2018 Winter Paralympics was held at Jeongseon Alpine Centre,
South Korea. The competition took place on 11 March 2018.

Medal table

Visually impaired
In the Super-G visually impaired, the athlete with a visual impairment has a sighted guide. The two skiers are considered a team, and dual medals are awarded.

The race was started at 09:30.

Standing
The race was started at 09:52.

Sitting
The race was started at 10:32.

See also
Alpine skiing at the 2018 Winter Olympics

References

Women's super-G
Para